Harold Norbert Kalas (March 26, 1936 – April 13, 2009) was an American sportscaster, best known for his Ford C. Frick Award-winning role as lead play-by-play announcer for Major League Baseball's Philadelphia Phillies, a position he held from 1971 until his death in 2009.

Kalas was also closely identified with the National Football League, serving as a voice-over narrator for NFL Films productions (a regular feature on Inside the NFL) and calling football games nationally for Westwood One radio.

Early life and family
Born in Chicago, Illinois, the son of a Methodist minister of Greek descent, Kalas graduated from Naperville High School in 1954 and from the University of Iowa in 1959 where he was a member of Phi Delta Theta Fraternity.  Upon graduation, he was immediately drafted into the United States Army and stationed in Hawaii.  After his discharge in 1961, Kalas began calling minor-league baseball games for the Hawaii Islanders.

Kalas had three sons: Todd, Brad, and Kane.  Todd is a former Phillies broadcaster who worked as a pregame/postgame–show host and is currently a play-by-play announcer for the Houston Astros.  Kane is a professional poker player.

Professional career
Kalas made his major-league debut in 1965 with the Houston Astros, replacing Al Helfer and working alongside Gene Elston and Loel Passe. He called the first game at Houston's Astrodome, on April 12, 1965.

He was hired by the Phillies in 1971 to succeed Bill Campbell, and was the master of ceremonies at the 1971 opening of Veterans Stadium. After the retirement of By Saam, Kalas was paired with Andy Musser and Hall of Fame player Richie Ashburn.

Philadelphia Phillies
While initially meeting with a lukewarm reception due to his replacement of the popular Campbell, Kalas soon won the hearts of Phillies fans with his easy-going style, his mellow, baritone, leathery voice (which rose to great excitement upon great plays on the field or Phillies' home runs, especially in key situations), his love of the game and also his accessibility to Phillies fans, for whom he professed a strong love.

During his Phillies career, he called six no-hit games, six National League Championship Series, and three World Series (1983, 1993, and 2008).  However, due to MLB rules at the time, he could not call the 1980 World Series, as local broadcasters were not allowed to call games due to contract conflicts with MLB, NBC and CBS Radio.  Public outcry caused MLB to change its policies the following year.

Kalas also called the first game at Veterans Stadium (April 10, 1971), the last game at Veterans Stadium (September 28, 2003), and the first game at Citizens Bank Park (April 12, 2004).

Kalas was sidelined for a few days in late July 2008 to treat a detached retina.

On April 8, 2009, the Phillies honored Kalas by having him throw out the first pitch before a game against the Atlanta Braves. Kalas's pitch was part of the pre-game ceremony in which the Phillies received their 2008 World Series championship rings. The ceremony would be part of Kalas's last home game.

On May 15, 2009, during a series in Washington, the Phillies visited the White House and were congratulated by President Barack Obama for their 2008 World Series championship. The visit had been postponed from April 14, due to Kalas's death the preceding day. The President mentioned Kalas, his voice, his love for the Phillies, and his legacy. This was the second of two tributes to Kalas in Washington. On April 21, eight days after Kalas's death, then–U.S. Congressman Joe Sestak paid tribute to Kalas in the House of Representatives. At the time, Sestak represented Pennsylvania's 7th congressional district, where Kalas resided.

Richie Ashburn

Kalas and Ashburn became beloved figures in Philadelphia, and also became best friends. They worked together for 27 seasons until Ashburn's death on September 9, 1997, of a heart attack in his sleep in a New York City hotel room after broadcasting a Phillies/Mets game at Shea Stadium. It is believed by many that Kalas never got over the death of his partner and friend, openly stating more than 11 years afterward that he still grieved over Ashburn's death.

Memorable calls

Kalas' familiar home run call was "Swing ... and a long drive, this ball is ... outta here! Home run Ryan Howard!
If it was a gigantic home run, he sometimes inserted "deep (left center)" after "and a long drive" and described it as "that ball's way outta here!"

As a guest on ESPN's Sunday Night Baseball on July 15, 2007, Kalas recounted that his famous "outta here" call originated in the mid-1970s. While standing around the batting cage during batting practice, he saw Phillies slugger Greg Luzinski hit a ball into the upper deck, to which Philly shortstop Larry Bowa reacted with the words, "Wow! That's way outta here." Kalas said that it had a nice "unique ring to it and has been using it ever since".

Other broadcasters have used Kalas' "outta here" call, including Gary Cohen of the New York Mets, Jerry Coleman of the San Diego Padres, Duane Kuiper of the San Francisco Giants and Terry Smith of the Los Angeles Angels of Anaheim.

Kalas made, arguably, his most memorable call on April 18, 1987, when Mike Schmidt hit his 500th career home run. 

In 1980, after the Phillies won the World Series, Kalas and the rest of the Phillies' radio crew re-created the call that Kalas probably would have made when Tug McGraw struck out Willie Wilson to win Game 6 and the World Series between the Phillies and the Kansas City Royals. 

This call was not made live by Kalas, as MLB radio-broadcasting regulations at the time forbade local stations from producing live coverage of World Series games, instead forcing them to air the national CBS Radio feed of the games. Philadelphia fans were so outraged about this afterward that they started a letter-writing campaign to the Commissioner's Office, demanding a change to the rule. Due at least in part to this outcry from Philadelphia fans, MLB amended its broadcasting contracts the following year to allow World Series teams' flagship radio stations to air the games with local announcers. Nevertheless, Kalas was part of the Phillies' World Series celebration in 1980, and rode in the team's victory parade down Broad Street.

Kalas did call the 1980 NLCS, but his call of the final out was drowned out by Tim McCarver's laughter.

Kalas called a grand slam home run by Mariano Duncan off Lee Smith in 1993:

Another memorable call by Kalas was his description of Mitch Williams's strikeout of Bill Pecota for the final out of Game 6 of the 1993 National League Championship Series between the Phillies and Atlanta Braves:

Another of Kalas' famous calls came less than two weeks later with Joe Carter's famous walk-off home run to end the World Series, though the Phillies lost the series: 

On April 4, 2003, Kalas called a grand slam by Chase Utley in Utley's major-league debut: 

On June 14, 2004, Kalas called the 400th home run hit by Jim Thome, using the call he used in later years when it was uncertain whether the ball would clear the fence: 

On September 8, 2005, Kalas calls an eventual game-winning 3-run home run by Craig Biggio in top of the 9th off Billy Wagner.

On August 9, 2006, Kalas called a close play at the plate as Chase Utley scored from second base on a routine groundout against the Atlanta Braves: 

Here is Kalas's call of Brett Myers' strikeout of Washington's Wily Mo Pena to clinch the 2007 National League East division title for the Phillies on the last day of the season, completing a comeback as they erased a seven-game deficit behind the New York Mets in early September: 

Kalas' call on the Phillies' victory in Game 5 of the 2008 NLCS: 

On October 29, 2008, Kalas was finally able to call a Phillies' championship-winning moment in the World Series when Brad Lidge struck out Eric Hinske to win the 104th Fall Classic:

Kalas made his final call on April 12, 2009, during the Phillies game against the Colorado Rockies:

Miscellany
Kalas was known for his love of the Frank Sinatra song, "High Hopes", a melody he sang at numerous events, including the Phillies' championship celebrations in his later years. His most famous singing of "High Hopes" came in 1993 when he sang to the team after they clinched the NL East division title. On April 17, 2009, at the first home game after Kalas's death, fans sang along with a video of Harry singing "High Hopes" during the seventh-inning stretch, instead of the traditional "Take Me Out to the Ball Game".

Kalas had sung "Take Me Out To The Ball Game" on several occasions during the seventh-inning stretch at Wrigley Field in Chicago on several occasions in tribute to Harry Caray, the late voice of the Chicago Cubs, who had led fans in that song at most home games.  However, by that time, Kalas, a native of the Chicago area, had become an openly avid Phillies fan, and held the microphone out to the audience to hear them sing "the Cubbies" as they replaced their team's name for "the home team" in the song's lyrics.

Kalas, due to his stay in Hawaii, was very proficient at pronouncing Polynesian names.  He also liked to slowly enunciate certain players' names, especially those with ethnic names.  His personal favorite, Mickey Morandini, was pronounced as "Mi-ckey Mor-an-DI-ni".

Kalas attributed his leathery voice to his habit of smoking Parliament cigarettes, and some of the Phillies players lit up Parliaments after Kalas' death as a tribute.

NFL Films
Kalas joined NFL Films as a narrator in 1975. He became its primary voice, following the passing of John Facenda in 1984. He provided the narration to the highlights on Inside the NFL from its inception in 1976 through the 2008 season. Following Kalas' death, fellow Philadelphia Phillies announcer Scott Graham took over his Inside the NFL duties.

Other ventures
In addition to his work with the Phillies and NFL Films, Kalas called various sports over the years for the Mutual Broadcasting System, CBS Radio, and Westwood One Radio (including the NFL, MLB, college basketball, and Notre Dame football). Kalas joined Dennis Green to call the 1985 Aloha Bowl between Alabama and USC. For many years, he narrated the "Alcoa Fantastic Finishes" in-game highlights spots, for use during NFL telecasts. His voice was used for narration of WLVT-TV's documentary on the Lehigh-Lafayette Rivalry, produced in 2004. Kalas also lent his voice to NFL Network's game telecasts, reading sponsor plugs during commercial breaks. He was replaced by Pat Summerall after his death.

Along with Joe Kapp, Kalas called the 1982 Liberty Bowl...the last game of Paul "Bear" Bryant's career and his 323rd victory.

Kalas also lent his voice to the commercials for the movie Leatherheads, as well as commercials for the Campbell Soup Company (including Campbell's Chunky Soup), GMC Truck, Sega Genesis Sports Games, Coors Light, and others.

Kalas provided the recorded voice-over for much of the self-guided tours at the United States Mint in Philadelphia and the Gateway Arch in St. Louis.

He also narrated/commentated Animal Planet's Puppy Bowls I-V from 2005 to 2009.  Puppy Bowl VI was dedicated in his memory.

He also made an appearance on the song "Rain Delay" by the Philadelphia-based rock group Marah.

Death

Kalas died of heart disease on Monday, April 13, 2009, in Washington, D.C. He collapsed in the Nationals Park press box at approximately 12:30 pm, several hours before the Washington Nationals' home opener against the Phillies. Kalas was rushed to George Washington University Hospital, where he was pronounced dead at 1:20 pm EDT. "We lost Harry [today]," David Montgomery, the team president, said. "We lost our voice." Before the game began, Kalas's death was announced to the crowd, his picture was displayed on the scoreboard, and the stadium observed a minute of silence. The Phillies went on to win the game, 9–8. The Phillies saluted Kalas by placing a picture of him in their dugout during the game. Center fielder Shane Victorino also saluted Kalas after hitting a solo home run by pointing up to the press box where Kalas would have called the game. Phillies fans created a makeshift memorial at the Mike Schmidt statue outside of Citizens Bank Park (at the Third Base Gate) shortly after Kalas's death was announced.

Kalas suffered from atherosclerosis and hypertension in his later years, but those illnesses did not seem to affect his announcing abilities; he had called the Phillies/Rockies game in Denver on April 12, the day before his death. Kalas was in his 39th season with the Phillies.

Though the Phillies were scheduled to visit the White House on April 14 to celebrate their 2008 World Series championship, the visit was postponed so that the day could be set aside to remember Kalas. Their White House visit was pushed back to May 15, coinciding with the Phillies' next scheduled visit to town to play the Nationals.

On Friday, April 17, 2009, Kalas's three children—Todd (himself a former Phillies broadcaster), Brad, and Kane—threw out the ceremonial first pitches before the Phillies first home game after Kalas' death at Citizens Bank Park to Mike Schmidt, John Kruk, and Jimmy Rollins, representatives of the three decades of Phillies baseball with Kalas. Following a moment of silence, Kane sang the national anthem.

The next day, Kalas became the fourth person to be given the honor of having their body lie in repose inside a major-league baseball stadium — after Babe Ruth, Jack Buck, and Miller Huggins — when his casket was displayed behind home plate and fans were encouraged to pay their respects at Citizens Bank Park. Kalas's casket was passed along by friends, broadcast partners, and every player on the Phillies team roster, before it was placed in a hearse which carried him out of Citizens Bank Park one final time.

After leaving the ballpark, Kalas' body was laid to rest in a private service at Philadelphia's historic Laurel Hill Cemetery. In August 2009, two pairs of seats from Veterans Stadium were installed at his graveside, one pair on each side, facing each other at a 45° angle. In the summer of 2010, a headstone was added to the grave, and the fan-made plywood "P" was removed as was the bronze plaque with his likeness.  The headstone consists of a granite microphone with the letters "HK" in the middle and a likeness of Kalas' autograph (which includes the "HOF 2002" that Kalas added to his autographs after his receipt of the Ford C. Frick Award) at the microphone's base, and that sits on top of a raised base shaped like a home plate.  Engraved in the base are the following words:

On September 29, 2010, Kalas's grave was resurfaced with sod that originally came from Citizens Bank Park, which was previously removed for the 2009 season when that stadium was re-sodded.  The sod had been preserved in live condition for sale to fans at a southern New Jersey sod farm that deals in sod for sports arenas.  That farm donated a portion of the former Citizens Bank Park sod when a fan, who volunteers at Laurel Hill Cemetery, contacted that farm regarding using that sod on Kalas's grave in Kalas's memory, as Kalas himself had walked on that sod, and had called the 2008 World Series victory which had come on that very grass.

During the winter of 2011–2012, a baseball quote by A. Bartlett Giamatti was added to the top of the home plate-shaped plinth of the tombstone.  It reads,

Honors

Nicknamed "Harry the K" by Phillies pitcher Larry Christenson in the mid-1970s, a nickname quickly adopted by Phillies fans, Kalas received the Ford C. Frick Award from the National Baseball Hall of Fame in 2002. In 2004, he was named Person of the Year by the Broadcast Pioneers of Philadelphia. That year, he was also inducted into the Philadelphia Sports Hall of Fame, as a member of the charter class (21 members). He was named Pennsylvania Sportscaster of the Year 18 times.

Kalas also helped announce the ceremonial closing of Veterans Stadium on September 28, 2003, and was the master of ceremonies at the ceremonial opening of Citizens Bank Park in 2004.

At Citizens Bank Park, the restaurant built into the base of the main scoreboard is named "Harry the K's" in Kalas's honor. After Kalas's death, the Phillies' TV-broadcast booth was renamed "The Harry Kalas Broadcast Booth".  It is directly next to the radio-broadcast booth, which is named "The Richie 'Whitey' Ashburn Broadcast Booth".

When Kalas died on April 13, 2009, fans created an impromptu memorial tribute to him at the base of the statue of Mike Schmidt at the Third Base Gate of Citizens Bank Park.

The Phillies honored Kalas for the remainder of the 2009 season with a round, black "HK" patch over the heart on all player, coach, and manager jerseys. Additionally, a billboard featuring a microphone, his initials and lifespan ("HK 1936–2009") was displayed on the wall in left-center field during the 2009 season.

Immediately after the Phillies clinched the National League Eastern Division, the players all went to the billboard, lit cigars and poured beer and champagne on the billboard as a symbolic way of including Kalas in the celebration, as Kalas had participated in all of the Phillies' victory celebrations during his tenure in Philadelphia, including both World Series wins, having ridden in both of the Phillies World Series parades.

The Phillies players, led by Shane Victorino, hung Kalas' signature baby-blue blazer and white loafers in the dugout for every game.

Following Kalas' death, the Phillies began playing a video of Kalas singing the first verse of "High Hopes" at Citizens Bank Park after every Phillies win, as well as playing Kalas's famous "This ball is outta here!" call at Citizens Bank Park after every Phillies home run.

The Broadcast Pioneers of Philadelphia inducted Kalas into their Hall of fame in 2000 and named him their Person of the Year in 2004.

In 2009, Kalas was that year's inductee into the Philadelphia Baseball Wall of Fame.

In June 2009, the National Radio Hall of Fame announced that Kalas would be posthumously inducted into its Hall of Fame. Thirteen other sportscasters were previously inducted into the Hall of Fame.

Phillies fan Antonio Jose initiated an online petition seeking support for a statue of Kalas to be erected outside the Phillies' ballpark. As of May 2010, there were 24,000 signatories. Sculptor Lawrence Nowlan designed a model for the statue.  In September 2010, a story that aired on the 10 Show on WCAU-TV stated that the full-size clay model for the statue was nearly complete, and was ready to have a mold of it cast so the actual bronze statue can be cast.

On Tuesday, August 16, 2011, the Nowlan sculpture, a  bronze statue (which depicts Kalas standing cross-legged on a home plate, holding a microphone in his right hand, which also holds a baseball bat that he was leaning upon) was unveiled in the Ashburn Alley outfield concourse at Citizens Bank Park between Harry the K's Restaurant and the statue of Richie Ashburn prior to that evening's game versus the Arizona Diamondbacks.  This unveiling was postponed from the previous Sunday, when the statue was scheduled to be unveiled prior to the game versus the Washington Nationals, which had been rained out.

The 2010 Mummers Parade on New Year's Day featured the Happy Tappers Comics dressed as Phillies players with the "HK" patch on the Phillies jerseys to pay tribute to Kalas and their theme was "Harry K's Field of Dreams."

See also
List of Philadelphia Phillies broadcasters
List of sports announcers
Broadcasting of sports events
Philadelphia Phillies award winners and league leaders
Philadelphia Baseball Wall of Fame

Citations

Sources

External links
Harry Kalas at the Baseball Hall of Fame
Harry Kalas at The Deadball Era
Kalas' Astros Daily Audio Clip: Jimmy Wynn homerun call (July 23, 1967), Forbes Field, Pittsburgh
Famed call by Kalas of Mike Schmidt's 500th homerun at Three Rivers Stadium, April 18, 1987, MLB
Harry Kalas Phillies Nation Audio Clip: The Philadelphia Phillies are 2008 World Champions of Baseball (Wednesday, October 29, 2008, Citizens Bank Park, Philadelphia, PA)
Harry Kalas at Broadcast Pioneers of Philadelphia Hall of Fame
Harry Kalas at Philadelphia Sports Hall of Fame

1936 births
2009 deaths
American radio sports announcers
American television sports announcers
Burials at Laurel Hill Cemetery (Philadelphia)
College basketball announcers in the United States
College football announcers
Deaths from coronary artery disease
Deaths from hypertension
Ford C. Frick Award recipients
Houston Astros announcers
Major League Baseball broadcasters
Major Indoor Soccer League (1978–1992) commentators
Minor League Baseball broadcasters
National Football League announcers
New York Jets announcers
NFL Films people
Notre Dame Fighting Irish football announcers
People from Delaware County, Pennsylvania
People from Naperville, Illinois
Philadelphia Phillies announcers
Radio personalities from Philadelphia
United States Army soldiers
University of Iowa alumni